Thoms Cove, the nickname for Thomas Cove, is a natural cove approximately  in diameter in Hawkins Point, Baltimore on the northeastern end of the peninsula with the tidal Patapsco River to the northeast, Curtis Bay to the northwest, Hawkins Point to the west and I-695 to the south.

Thoms Cove is bordered by Eastalco Aluminum Company's loading and storage facility and a Superfund landfill. It is in the USGS quadrangle "Curtis Bay" and a Maryland grid coordinate of
500800N and 928000E and is largely administered by the Maryland Port Administration.

References

Coves of the United States
Bodies of water of Baltimore County, Maryland
Bodies of water of Baltimore
Bays of Maryland
Hawkins Point, Baltimore